Chrysina woodi, or Wood's jewel scarab, is a species of shining leaf chafer in the family of beetles known as Scarabaeidae. The name was first published in the minutes of a meeting in 1884 as woodi, in advance of the formal description of the species as woodii in 1885, but under ICZN Article 50.2, the 1884 name and spelling take precedence.

References

External links

 

Rutelinae
Articles created by Qbugbot
Beetles described in 1884